Francisco Diece de Oliveira Pereira (born 17 June 1986), commonly known as Diece, is a Brazilian futsal player who plays for Svarog FC Teplice as a winger.

Career
Born in Fortaleza, Diece's career started in Minas Tênis Clube, where he won three Minas Gerais State Championship, plus three Belo Horizonte Metropolitan Championship.

On 4 August 2010, Diece made his first move abroad, joining Benfica in a three-year deal, as the Portuguese club sought a replacement for Ricardinho. Over the course of his contract, he helped the Lisbon-side win a league and cup double in 2011–12, plus two supercups, returning to Brazil in July 2013, as a free player, to play for Intelli.

In the Orlândia team, he won his first league title in Brazil, and his first continental title, the 2013 Copa de Libertadores. He left Intelli in December 2014 and moved to Clube Atlético Deportivo in Guarapuava, helping them finish eight and qualify for the second phase. After a year there, he signed with Carlos Barbosa, who had just won the 2015 Liga Futsal against his former team, Intelli.

Honours
Benfica
 Liga Portuguesa: 2011–12
 Taça de Portugal: 2011–12
 Supertaça de Portugal: 2011, 2012

Intelli
 Copa Libertadores de Futsal: 2013
 Liga Futsal: 2013

References

1986 births
Living people
Brazilian men's futsal players
Minas Tênis Clube players
S.L. Benfica futsal players
ADC Intelli players
Brazilian expatriates in Portugal
Sportspeople from Fortaleza